Euphrasie Kandeke was a Burundian politician. She was named Minister for Women's Questions by Jean-Baptiste Bagaza in 1982 (some sources state instead that she took the position in 1974.) She served alongside Caritas Mategeko Karadereye, who at the time was the Minister of Social Affairs; the two were the first women to serve in the Burundian cabinet. She remained in her position until 1987. During her career she also served as the secretary general of the Burundian Women's Federation, and was a member of the political bureau of the Union for National Progress. Later she was imprisoned, being taken into custody the night before the 1987 coup; among her offenses was held to be making the suggestion that the army should be smaller. While in jail she was served Fanta lemonade mixed with salt, among other hardships. Kandeke was a Tutsi.

See also
List of the first women holders of political offices in Africa

References

Possibly living people
Government ministers of Burundi
20th-century women politicians
Union for National Progress politicians
Prisoners and detainees of Burundi
Tutsi people
Women government ministers of Burundi
Year of birth missing